María Concepción García Gainza (born 1 December 1937) is a Spanish art historian, educator, and writer. She is Professor Emeritus at the University of Navarre. She is also a corresponding academic at the Royal Academy of Fine Arts of San Fernando and the Academy de Santa Isabel de Hungary in Seville.

Life
Gainza was born in Pamplona in 1937.

She was educated at the University of Navarra, in the days of Dean Antonio Fontán.

In 1962 she began teaching at the University of Navarra.
In 1970, she became an associate professor at the University of Seville. She was the first woman to take over a university position from a man. She taught Contemporary Art and Spanish Renaissance classes at the University of Seville. She was there for five years working with Antonio Bonet Correa.

In March 1975 she was given the Chair at the University of Murcia. She was not there long and she returned the following year to the University of Navarra where she works for 25 years up to her retirement. As Director of Research she was overseen 50 research works and about thirty Doctoral Theses.

She has directed and contributed to Catálogo monumental de Navarra which describes the complete culture and art of Navarre. The work is published in nine volumes and represents 20 years of her and her collaborators research.

She was director of the Department of Art History and is currently Director of the Navarro Heritage and Art Chair. She is an expert on Spanish Renaissance and Baroque art who has presented at national and international conferences. Her research focus is the history of Italian and Spanish sculpture of the sixteenth to eighteenth centuries.

She is Professor Emeritus at the University of Navarre and she is a corresponding academic at the Royal Academy of Fine Arts of San Fernando and Santa Isabel de Hungary in Seville. rorororor

Works include
Catálogo monumental de Navarra, 1989
 El escultor Luis Salvador Carmona (1990)

Awards
Prince of Viana Award for Culture
Merindad de Tudela Award
Cadena Cope Award for Culture

References

1937 births
Living people
People from Pamplona
Spanish art historians